Water sprouts or water shoots are shoots that arise from the trunk of a tree or from branches that are several years old, from latent buds. The latent buds might be visible on the bark of the tree, or submerged under the bark as epicormic buds. They are sometimes called suckers,  although that term is more correctly applied to shoots that arise from below ground, from the roots, and a distance from the trunk. Vigorous upright water sprouts often develop in response to damage or pruning.

The structure of water-sprout regrowth is not as strong as natural tree growth, and the shoots are more subject to diseases and pests. A system of principles of pruning considers this type of shoot undesirable on orchard trees because very little fruit is produced on them.

Vigorous water sprouts are useful as scions in grafting.

See also 
 Adventitiousness, shoots that develop in unusual places
 Apical dominance, dominance of the main central stem of a plant 
 Basal shoots, also called suckers
 Coppicing, a method of woodland management
 Epicormic shoot, shoots that develop from buds under the bark
 Pollarding, a pruning system in which the upper branches of a tree are removed, which encourages watersprouts

References

External links 
 

Horticulture
Plant morphology